Saint Bernadette School is a private, Catholic elementary school in New Haven, Connecticut, USA. It was founded in 1956 and is merged with Saint Bernadette Catholic Church. It provides education for ages 3–14 and usually stays within 150-200 children in the school. The current principal is Edward Goad.

Recognition
The hit song "In the Still of the Night" by The Five Satins was recorded in the school basement in 1956.

References

External links
School website
Church website

Public elementary schools in Connecticut
Educational institutions established in 1956
Schools in New Haven, Connecticut
1956 establishments in Connecticut